The Anonymous Was A Woman Award is a grant program for women artists who are over 40 years of age, in part to counter sexism in the art world. It began in 1996 in direct response to the National Endowment for the Arts' decision to stop funding individual artists.

The award comes with a grant of $25,000 and is designed to enable exceptional woman artists to further develop their work. Awardees are chosen on the basis of their past accomplishments, their originality and artistic growth, and the quality of their work. Since 1996, some 220 women have received the award and approximately 5.5 million USD has been awarded in total.

The award was founded by a New York artist who originally chose to remain anonymous. She named the award in reference to a line from the Virginia Woolf book A Room of One's Own and in recognition of all the women artists through the ages who have remained anonymous for various reasons. Nominators, who include art writers, curators, art historians, and previous winners, are likewise unnamed.

In July 2018, the artist Susan Unterberg was revealed as both the founder and funder of the award. Before 2018, she had remained anonymous so that her artwork would be evaluated in its own context, without being influenced by her contributions. In an interview, she described her reasons for coming forward, stating "It’s a great time for women to speak up. I feel I can be a better advocate having my own voice," and that she can now work openly to further the organization's cause and to encourage philanthropists and women artists. On top of the awarded grants, Unterberg is considering other forms of programs, possibly seminars, to complement the grants.

Award winners 
Listed below are the winners of the award.

2020 

 D.Y. Begay – Textiles
 Linda Goode Bryant – Installation
 Barbara Chase-Riboud – Sculpture, Installation
 Elena del Rivero – Painting, Drawing 
 Chitra Ganesh – Drawing
 Karen Gunderson – Painting
 Virginia Jaramillo – Painting
 Claudia Joskowicz – Film, Video
 Karyn Olivier – Sculpture
 Juana Valdés – Interdisciplinary

2019 

 Elia Alba – Interdisciplinary
 Marsha Cottrell – Drawing
 Torkwase Dyson – Painting
 Heide Fasnacht – Painting, Drawing, Sculpture
 Nona Faustine – Photography
 Rhodessa Jones – Interdisciplinary
 Jennifer Wen Ma – Visual Art
 Amie Siegel – Interdisciplinary
 Diane Simpson – Sculpture
 Karina Aguilera Skvirsky – Photography, Video, Performance

2018 

 Dotty Attie – Painting
 María Magdalena Campos-Pons – Photography, performance, painting, sculpture, film, and video
 Patty Chang – Performance, video, writing, installation
 Beverly Fishman – Painting
 Kate Gilmore – Installation, video, performance
 Heather Hart – Multi-disciplinary
 Deborah Roberts – Mixed media
 Rocío Rodríguez – Painting 
 Michèle Stephenson – Film
 Betty Tompkins – Painting

2017 

Nancy Bowen – Sculpture and drawing
Martha Diamond – Painting
Stephanie Jackson – Painting
Jennie C. Jones – Mixed-media
Marisa Morán Jahn – Sculpture, film, video, public art, performance
Amalia Mesa-Bains – Visual art
Amy Sherald – Painting
Michelle Stuart – Visual art
Mia Westerlund Roosen – Sculpture
Carrie Yamaoka – Visual art

2016 

Shiva Ahmadi
Laura Anderson Barbata
Tania Bruguera
Sonya Clark
Simone Leigh
Medrie MacPhee
Eiko Otake
Rona Pondick
Lourdes Portillo
Shinique Smith

2015 

Donna Dennis
Wendy Ewald
Simone Forti
Rachel Harrison
Pam Lins
Jennifer Montgomery
Dona Nelson
Lisa Sanditz
Lisa Sigal
Julianne Swartz

2014 

Janine Antoni
Nicole Eisenman
Harmony Hammond
Kira Lynn Harris
Lynn Hershman Leeson
Hilja Keading
Elizabeth King
Beverly Semmes
Elise Siegel
Marianne Weems

2013 

Alice Aycock
Uta Barth
Diana Cooper
Suzan Frecon
Katy Grannan
Jane Hammond
Sharon Hayes
Suzanne Lacy
Liza Lou
Sarah Oppenheimer
Yvonne Rainer
Mickalene Thomas

2012 

Ann Agee
Andrea Fraser
Mary Kelly
Jae Ko
Judy Pfaff
Betye Saar
Lorna Simpson
Jessica Stockholder

2011 

Eleanor Antin
Linda Besemer
Dara Birnbaum
Andrea Bowers
Ann Hamilton
Yoko Inoue
Jungjin Lee
Mary Miss
Sheila Pepe
Judith Shea

2010 

Maureen Connor
Samm Kunce
Louise Lawler
Elizabeth LeCompte
Suzanne McClelland
Joyce Pensato
Laura Poitras
Victoria Sambunaris
Arlene Shechet
Eve Sussman

2009 

Ida Applebroog
Phyllis Bramson
Patricia Cronin
Taylor Davis
Elana Herzog
Andrea Modica
Carrie Moyer
Kelly Reichardt
Kay Rosen
Penelope Umbrico

2008 

KayLynn Deveney
Lesley Dill
Gail Dolgin
Rochelle Feinstein
Beryl Korot
Catherine Lord
Lorraine O’Grady
Christy Rupp
Nancy Shaver
Frances Stark

2007 

Miriam Beerman
Lois Conner
Petah Coyne
Agnes Denes
Diane Edison
Paula Hayes
Joan Semmel
Jill Slosburg-Ackerman
Leslie Thornton
Carrie Mae Weems

2006 

Xenobia Bailey
Francis Barth
Judith Bernstein
Ellen Bruno
Terry Evans
Mary Heilmann
An-My Le
Howardena Pindell
Martha Rosler
Marie K. Watt

2005 

Nancy Chunn
Deborah Hoffman
Sharon Horvath
Zoe Leonard
Judy Linn
Senga Nengudi
Carolee Schneemann
Valeska Soares
Kathryn Spence
Meg Webster

2004 

Janet Biggs
Moyra Davey
Liz Deschenes
Jessica Diamond
Joy Garnett
Elizabeth Lyons
Sarah McEneaney
J. Morgan Puett
Alison Saar
Carmelita Tropicana

2003 

Meg Cranston
Nancy Davenport
Nancy Dwyer
Maria Elena Gaitan
Gillian Jagger
Nina Katchadourian
Melissa Miller
Joan Nelson
Frances Reid
Hanneline Rogeberg

2002 

Lutz Bacher
Beverly Buchanan
Kathy Butterly
Pat de Groot
Alison Knowles
Deborah Luster
Sana Musasama
Connie Samaras
Kimsooja
Gail Wight

2001 

Judith Barry
Nao Bustamante
Marta Chilindron
Anne Chu
Laura Letinsky
Yong Soon Min
Maria Nordman
Clarissa Sligh
Mierle Laderman Ukeles
Jan Yager

2000 

Laura Aguilar
Chakaia Booker
Margaret Honda
Mildred Howard
Liz Larner
Beverly McIver
Catherine Murphy
Judith Joy Ross
Ritsuko Taho
Kukuli Velarde

1999 

Beth B
Sheila Batiste
Ginny Bishton
Nancy Burson
Judy Fox
Judith Linhares
Ruth Marten
Renee Stout
Steina Vasulka
Cecilia Vicuña

1998 

Polly Apfelbaum
Cindy Bernard
Ellen Driscoll
Jeanne Dunning
Nene Humphrey
Joan Jonas
Sermin Kardestuncer
Lisa Lewenz
Ann Messner
Shelly Silver

1997 

Tomie Arai
Gretchen Bender
Nancy B. Davidson
Cheryl Donegan
Cheryl Dunye
Judy Glantzman
Maria Elena Gonzalez
Kathy Grove
Maren Hassinger
Mary Lucier
Joyce Scott

1996 

Rachel Berwick
Gina Lamb
Claudia Matzko
Robin Mitchell
Jeanne Silverthorne
Shellburne Thurber
Deborah Willis 
Lucy Winer
Lynne Yamamoto
Kim Yasuda

References 

Fellowships
Lists of award winners
Arts awards in the United States
Awards established in 1996
1996 establishments in the United States